Myida (formerly Myoida) is an order of saltwater and freshwater clams, marine and freshwater bivalve molluscs in the subclass Heterodonta. The order includes such bivalves as soft-shell clams, geoducks and shipworms.

Description
They are burrowing molluscs with well-developed siphons. The shell is relatively soft and lacks a nacreous layer. Some species have a single cardinal tooth.

Superfamilies and families
Superfamilies and families within the Myida include:

 Superfamily: Dreissenoidea
 Family: Dreissenidae
 Superfamily: Myoidea
 Family: Corbulidae
 Family: Myidae
 Family: †Pleurodesmatidae
 Family: †Raetomyidae
 Superfamily: Pholadoidea
 Family: Pholadidae
 Family: Teredinidae
 Family: Xylophagaidae
 Superfamily: †Pleuromyoidea
 Family: †Ceratomyidae
 Family: †Pleuromyidae
 Family: †Vacunellidae

References

 Powell A W B, New Zealand Mollusca, William Collins Publishers Ltd, Auckland, New Zealand 1979

External links
 Animaldiversity
 Taxonomicon

 
Bivalve orders